KMCW-LP (channel 14) was a low-power television station in Medford, Oregon, United States. It was owned by Northwest Broadcasting alongside Fox affiliate KMVU (channel 26) and MyNetworkTV affiliate KFBI-LD (channel 48).

History

KMCW-LP signed on the air on April 22, 2003. It was acquired by Modesto, California-based Sainte Partners II, L.P. (owned by Chester Smith) in 2006 and its new sister station KFBI would begin airing its programming in July 2006. KMCW began carrying NBC-owned Spanish-language network Telemundo and aired via internet link from Sainte's headquarters in Chico, California.

Ownership changes
In November 2007, it was announced that KMCW and sister station KFBI were up for sale, but they were never purchased. It remained Sainte property from then on.

In April 2012, station owners Sainte Television Group (aka Sainte Partners II) entered into a local marketing agreement with Bonten Media Group, a New York-based private equity group which owns Northern California ABC and MeTV affiliates KRCR-TV in Redding, California, and KAEF-TV in Eureka, California. KMCW and sister station KFBI were not included in the package and were sold to Northwest Broadcasting, owner of KMVU in Medford. KMCW replaced This TV (which now airs on KOBI-TV sub-channel 5.2) with Telemundo on sub-channel 48.2 while still airing on channel 14. KMCW had later changed its affiliation from Telemundo to MundoMax, and later to the religious network Sonlife.

In March of 2016, the station's license was cancelled and it has since gone dark.

Cable and satellite coverage
KMCW became available on local cable TV via Charter Communications on channel 3 in Medford and Klamath Falls as of September 5, 2006.

The station was not carried on either Dish Network or DirecTV.

MCW-LP
Religious television stations in the United States
Television channels and stations established in 2003
2003 establishments in Oregon
Television channels and stations disestablished in 2016
2016 disestablishments in Oregon
Defunct television stations in the United States
MCW-LP